The 1939 South Sydney Rabbitohs season was the 32nd in the club's history. The club competed in the New South Wales Rugby Football League Premiership (NSWRFL), finishing the season fourth.

Ladder

Fixtures

Regular season

Finals

References 

South Sydney Rabbitohs seasons
1939 in Australian rugby league